The Rockliff ministry is the current ministry of the Tasmanian Government, led by Jeremy Rockliff of the Tasmanian Liberals. It was formed on 8 April 2022, after Rockliff was elected unopposed as leader of the Liberal Party and sworn as the state's 47th Premier by Governor Barbara Baker. The ministry replaced the Second Gutwein ministry, after former Premier Peter Gutwein resigned from his position and quit politics.

First arrangement
Rockliff was sworn in as Premier and minister for two other departments on 8 April 2022, along with Michael Ferguson as Deputy Premier and Treasurer. The remaining ministerial positions were announced on 11 April, with Jo Palmer elevated to the cabinet. The swearing in by the Governor occurred the following day on 12 April.

References

Rockliff
Current governments